The Japanese anime television series Summer Time Rendering is based on the manga series of the same name written and illustrated by Yasuki Tanaka. The series was announced at the end of the 139th and final chapter of the manga in February 2021. It was later confirmed to be a 25-episode television series. The series was produced by OLM and directed by Ayumu Watanabe, with Hiroshi Seko overseeing the series' scripts, Miki Matsumoto designing the characters, and Kusanagi handling the art. Keiichi Okabe, Ryuichi Takada, and Keigo Hoashi composed the music at MONACA. It aired from April 15 to September 30, 2022, on Tokyo MX, BS11, and Kansai TV.

Disney Platform Distribution licensed the anime for an international release on Disney+. The international release dates vary between regions, starting from May 4, 2022, in Indonesia, Malaysia, and Thailand; June 1, 2022, in Australia, Hong Kong, New Zealand, Singapore and Taiwan; and July 20, 2022, in South Korea. On January 11, 2023, the entire series was launched in subbed and dubbed options in remaining international countries, including the United States where it was launched on Hulu.



Episode list

Notes

References

External links
 

Summer Time Rendering